Jonathan Penrose,  (7 October 1933 – 30 November 2021) was an English chess player, who held the titles Grandmaster (1993) and International Correspondence Chess Grandmaster (1983). He won the British Chess Championship ten times between 1958 and 1969.

Early years 
Penrose was born in Colchester. Learning the game at age four, he was a member of Hampstead Chess Club at twelve and British Boys (Under 18) Champion at just fourteen years of age. Chess was played by the entire Penrose family. His father was a composer of endgame studies and a strong player, as was his older brother Oliver.

By the age of seventeen, he was already acknowledged as a top prospect for British chess. Playing Hastings for the first time in 1950/51, he beat the French champion Nicolas Rossolimo and at Southsea in 1950, defeated both Efim Bogoljubov and Savielly Tartakower. In 1952/1953 he shared the first place at Hastings with Harry Golombek, Antonio Medina García and Daniel Yanofsky.

Playing career 

Penrose earned the International Master title in 1961 and was the leading British player for several years in the 1960s and early 1970s, surpassing the achievement of Henry Ernest Atkins by winning the British Championship a record number of times. He was widely considered to be of grandmaster strength, but did not achieve the grandmaster title during his active playing career, despite some notable victories. This was mainly due to his choosing to remain amateur and placing his lecturing as a first priority. As a consequence, he played few international tournaments and frequently turned down invitations to prestigious tournaments such as Hastings. Nevertheless, FIDE made him a grandmaster in 1993.

He competed in eight Chess Olympiads between 1952 and 1962, then at the Olympiads of 1968 and 1970, frequently posting excellent scores, including +9−1=7 in 1962 (Varna), and +10−0=5 in 1968 (Lugano). On both of these occasions, he won an individual silver medal on first board; in 1968, his score was bettered only by the World Champion, Tigran Petrosian.

At the Leipzig 1960 Olympiad, he defeated then-World Champion Mikhail Tal with the white pieces in a Modern Benoni:This victory made Penrose the first British player to beat a reigning world champion since Joseph Henry Blackburne defeated Emanuel Lasker in 1899.

Correspondence chess 
Penrose's over the board performance started to decline in the 1970s and he fainted at the 1970 Olympiad in the midst of a tense game. Consequently, he moved on to correspondence chess, where he was successful, earning the International Master (IMC) title in 1980 and the grandmaster (GMC) title in 1983. He led his country to victory in the 9th Correspondence Olympiad (1982–1987).

Personal life
Penrose was the son of Margaret Leathes and Lionel Penrose, a professor of genetics, the grandson of the physiologist John Beresford Leathes, and brother of Roger Penrose, Oliver Penrose, and Shirley Hodgson. He was a psychologist and university lecturer by profession, with a PhD. He had two daughters from his marriage to Margaret Wood. 

Penrose was awarded the OBE in 1971.

He died on 30 November 2021, at the age of 88.

References

Bibliography

External links
 
 
 
 
 
 

1933 births
2021 deaths
Chess grandmasters
Correspondence chess grandmasters
Chess double grandmasters
Chess Olympiad competitors
English chess players
English people of Russian-Jewish descent
People from Colchester
Officers of the Order of the British Empire